Latané or Latane is a surname. Notable people with the surname include:

Bibb Latané (born 1937), United States social psychologist
James Allen Latané (1831–1902), born in Essex County, Virginia
James Latane Noel, Jr. (1909–1997), United States federal judge
Robert Latane Montague (1829–1880), Virginia politician who served in the Confederate States Congress during the American Civil War